De Twentsche Courant Tubantia, commonly known as Tubantia, is a Dutch daily newspaper owned by DPG Media. In 2016 it was distributed in 91,313 copies in the regions of Twente and  Regge valley. Its headquarters are in Enschede.

References

Dutch-language newspapers
Daily newspapers published in the Netherlands
Mass media in Overijssel
Salland
Twente
Enschede